Ameca may refer to:

Biology
 Ameca (fish), a monotypic ray-finned fish genus in the family Goodeidae, with the only species Ameca splendens

Places in Mexico
Ameca, Jalisco, a city and municipality in central Jalisco
Chiefdom of Ameca, a pre-Columbian state in Jalisco
Ameca Valley, a large expansive plateau in Jalisco
Ameca River
Amecameca, in the State of México, often informally abbreviated to "Ameca"

Humanoid Robot
Ameca (robot)